Bruno Candido Farias (born 20 November 1987), known as Bruno Farias, is a Brazilian footballer who plays as an attacking midfielder.

Club career
Farias was born in Junqueirópolis, São Paulo, and represented Dracena FC, São Paulo, Santos, Internacional and Palmeiras as a youth. He made his senior debut with the latter's B-team in 2007.

Farias made his Série A debut on 30 June 2007, coming on as a substitute in a 1–0 away win against Corinthians. After leaving Verdão, he subsequently represented Marília (two stints), Porto Alegre, Linense, Rio Claro, América-RN, Itumbiara, Audax, Joinville and Portuguesa.

References

External links
 

1987 births
Living people
Brazilian footballers
Association football midfielders
Campeonato Brasileiro Série A players
Campeonato Brasileiro Série B players
Campeonato Brasileiro Série C players
Campeonato Brasileiro Série D players
Sociedade Esportiva Palmeiras players
Marília Atlético Clube players
Porto Alegre Futebol Clube players
Clube Atlético Linense players
Rio Claro Futebol Clube players
América Futebol Clube (RN) players
Itumbiara Esporte Clube players
Grêmio Osasco Audax Esporte Clube players
Joinville Esporte Clube players
Associação Portuguesa de Desportos players